Elongin B is a protein that in humans is encoded by the ELOB gene.

Function 

Elongin B is a subunit of the transcription factor B (SIII) complex. The SIII complex is composed of elongins A/A2, B and C. It activates elongation by RNA polymerase II by suppressing transient pausing of the polymerase at many sites within transcription units. Elongin A functions as the transcriptionally active component of the SIII complex, whereas elongins B and C are regulatory subunits. Elongin A2 is specifically expressed in the testis, and capable of forming a stable complex with elongins B and C. The von Hippel-Lindau tumor suppressor protein binds to elongins B and C, and thereby inhibits transcription elongation. Two alternatively spliced transcript variants encoding different isoforms have been described for this gene.

Interactions 

TCEB2 has been shown to interact with:
 CUL2,
 TCEB1,  and
 Von Hippel-Lindau tumor suppressor.

References

Further reading

External links 
 PDBe-KB provides an overview of all the structure information available in the PDB for Human Elongin-B